Shantanu Kaiser (30 December 1954 – 11 April 2017) was a Bangladeshi poet and essayist. He was awarded Bangla Academy Literary Award (2014) in the essay category.

Early life and career
Kaiser earned his master's degree in English from the University of Dhaka.

Kaiser published 45 books.

Works
Kaiser published his first volume of poetry, Rakhaler Attochorit, in 1982. His second book Shuvo Shubornojoyonti was published in 2002. He wrote several books on the biography of the writer Adwaita Mallabarman including "Adwaita Mallabarman" (1987), "Adwaita Mallabarman: Jiban, Shahitya Ebong Onynyo" (1998) and "Janmashatabarshe Adwaita Mallabarman: Jiban, Shahitya O Shanshkriti" (2014). He edited Mallabarman's "Uponyassamagra" and "Titash Ekti Nadir Naam". He adapted  "Titash Ekti Nadir Naam" into a play. He wrote two books "Ful o Nazrul" and "Oi Nutoner Keton Ore" based on the works of poet Kazi Nazrul Islam.

References

1954 births
2017 deaths
People from Chandpur District
University of Dhaka alumni
Bangladeshi male poets
Bangladeshi essayists
Recipients of Bangla Academy Award